Metaxellus abacetoides is a species of beetle in the family Carabidae, the only species in the genus Metaxellus.

References

Pterostichinae